The 2017 UEFA Women's Under-17 Championship qualifying competition was a women's under-17 football competition that determined the seven teams joining the automatically qualified hosts Czech Republic in the 2017 UEFA Women's Under-17 Championship final tournament.

A total of 45 UEFA member national teams entered the qualifying competition (including Malta who entered for the first time). Players born on or after 1 January 2000 are eligible to participate. Each match has a duration of 80 minutes, consisting of two halves of 40 minutes with a 15-minute half-time.

Format
The qualifying competition consists of two rounds:
Qualifying round: Apart from Spain, which receive a bye to the elite round as the team with the highest seeding coefficient, the remaining 44 teams are drawn into 11 groups of four teams. Each group is played in single round-robin format at one of the teams selected as hosts after the draw. The 11 group winners, the 11 runners-up, and the third-placed team with the best record against the first and second-placed teams in their group advance to the elite round.
Elite round: The 24 teams are drawn into six groups of four teams. Each group is played in single round-robin format at one of the teams selected as hosts after the draw. The six group winners and the runner-up with the best record against the first and third-placed teams in their group qualify for the final tournament.

Tiebreakers
The teams are ranked according to points (3 points for a win, 1 point for a draw, 0 points for a loss). If two or more teams are equal on points on completion of a mini-tournament, the following tie-breaking criteria are applied, in the order given, to determine the rankings (Regulations Articles 14.01 and 14.02):
Higher number of points obtained in the mini-tournament matches played among the teams in question;
Superior goal difference resulting from the mini-tournament matches played among the teams in question;
Higher number of goals scored in the mini-tournament matches played among the teams in question;
If, after having applied criteria 1 to 3, teams still have an equal ranking, criteria 1 to 3 are reapplied exclusively to the mini-tournament matches between the teams in question to determine their final rankings. If this procedure does not lead to a decision, criteria 5 to 9 apply;
Superior goal difference in all mini-tournament matches;
Higher number of goals scored in all mini-tournament matches;
If only two teams have the same number of points, and they are tied according to criteria 1 to 6 after having met in the last round of the mini-tournament, their rankings are determined by a penalty shoot-out (not used if more than two teams have the same number of points, or if their rankings are not relevant for qualification for the next stage).
Lower disciplinary points total based only on yellow and red cards received in the mini-tournament matches (red card = 3 points, yellow card = 1 point, expulsion for two yellow cards in one match = 3 points);
Higher position in the coefficient ranking list used for the qualifying round draw;
Drawing of lots.

To determine the best third-placed team from the qualifying round and the best runner-up from the elite round, the results against the teams in fourth place are discarded. The following criteria are applied (Regulations Article 15.01):
Higher number of points;
Superior goal difference;
Higher number of goals scored;
Lower disciplinary points total based only on yellow and red cards received (red card = 3 points, yellow card = 1 point, expulsion for two yellow cards in one match = 3 points);
Higher position in the coefficient ranking list used for the qualifying round draw;
Drawing of lots.

Qualifying round

Draw
The draw for the qualifying round was held on 13 November 2015, 08:40 CET (UTC+1), at the UEFA headquarters in Nyon, Switzerland.

The teams were seeded according to their coefficient ranking, calculated based on the following:
2013 UEFA Women's Under-17 Championship final tournament and qualifying competition (qualifying round and elite round)
2014 UEFA Women's Under-17 Championship final tournament and qualifying competition (qualifying round and elite round)
2015 UEFA Women's Under-17 Championship final tournament and qualifying competition (qualifying round and elite round)

Each group contained one team from Pot A, one team from Pot B, one team from Pot C, and one team from Pot D. For political reasons, Russia and Ukraine (due to the Russian military intervention in Ukraine) could not be drawn in the same group.

Notes
Teams marked in bold have qualified for the final tournament.

Groups
The qualifying round must be played between 1 September and 31 October 2016.

Times up to 29 October 2016 are CEST (UTC+2), thereafter times are CET (UTC+1).

Group 1

Group 2

Group 3

Group 4

Group 5

Group 6

Group 7

Group 8

Group 9

Group 10

Group 11

Ranking of third-placed teams
To determine the best third-placed team from the qualifying round which advance to the elite round, only the results of the third-placed teams against the first and second-placed teams in their group are taken into account.

Elite round

Draw
The draw for the elite round was held on 11 November 2016, 11:40 CET (UTC+1), at the UEFA headquarters in Nyon, Switzerland.

The teams were seeded according to their results in the qualifying round. Spain, which received a bye to the elite round, were automatically seeded into Pot A. Each group contained one team from Pot A, one team from Pot B, one team from Pot C, and one team from Pot D. Teams from the same qualifying round group could not be drawn in the same group.

Groups
The elite round must be played between 1 February and 2 April 2017.

Times up to 25 March 2017 are CET (UTC+1), thereafter times are CEST (UTC+2).

Group 1

Group 2

Group 3

Group 4

Group 5

Group 6

Ranking of second-placed teams
To determine the best second-placed team from the elite round which qualify for the final tournament, only the results of the second-placed teams against the first and third-placed teams in their group are taken into account.

Qualified teams
The following eight teams qualify for the final tournament.

1 Bold indicates champion for that year. Italic indicates host for that year.

Top goalscorers
The following players scored four goals or more in the qualifying competition:

10 goals

 Joëlle Smits

9 goals

 Melvine Malard

6 goals

 Laurène Martin
 Romée Leuchter
 Jenny Kristine Røsholm Olsen

5 goals

 Lauren Hemp
 Nicole Anyomi
 Vilde Birkeli
 Carla McManus

4 goals

 Jana Scharnböck
 Lisa Petry
 Dajan Hashemi
 Nicole Douglas
 Selma Bacha
 Gianna Rackow
 Ifigeneia Georgantzi
 Hlín Eiríksdóttir
 Morgan Cross

References

External links

Qualification
2017
2016 in women's association football
2017 in women's association football
2016 in youth association football
2017 in youth association football